The Castries River is a river in Castries Quarter on the island country of Saint Lucia.

See also
List of rivers of Saint Lucia

References

Rivers of Saint Lucia